The Epiphany or Theophany Monastery (better known as Bratsky, or Brotherhood Monastery) is a former Orthodox monastery in Podil, Kyiv, Ukraine, in the vicinity of Kontraktova Square. Its history has been interwoven with that of Mohyla Academy which now occupies the remaining monastery buildings.

The monastery is supposed to have been founded by Patriarch Jeremias II of Constantinople (†1595). Patriarch Theophanes III of Jerusalem had it reorganized as a local brotherhood school, hence the name. Its benefactors included Petro Sahaidachny (whose tomb was on the grounds), Petro Mohyla (who raised its status to that of collegium), and Ivan Mazepa (who asked Osip Startsev to design the five-domed katholikon in a style known as Mazepa Baroque). 

Mazepa's church, belfry, and most other buildings of the monastery were demolished by the Soviets in 1935. The remaining buildings have been either reduced to ruins or rebuilt with significant alterations (as was a refectory church, dating from the 17th century).

References 

Eastern Orthodox monasteries in Ukraine
Buildings and structures in Kyiv
Baroque architecture in Ukraine
Religious buildings and structures completed in 1620
Demolished Christian monasteries in Ukraine
Buildings and structures demolished in 1935
Ivan Mazepa
1620 establishments in the Polish–Lithuanian Commonwealth